Mnichov is a municipality and village in Cheb District in the Karlovy Vary Region of the Czech Republic. It has about 400 inhabitants.

Administrative parts

Villages of Rájov and Sítiny are administrative parts of Mnichov.

History
The first written mention of Mnichov is from 1273.

References

Villages in Cheb District